National Cycle Network (NCN) Route 65 is a Sustrans National Route that runs from Hornsea on the North Sea Coast of The East Riding of Yorkshire via Hull and York to Middlesbrough. It is fully open and signed.

Between Hornsea and York it forms the eastern end of the Trans Pennine Trail. The section between York and Linton-on-Ouse is part of the Way of the Roses. In 1998 Route 65 between Hull and Middlesbrough was branded The White Rose cycle route. This branding is no longer in use.

Route

Hornsea to Hull 

This part of the route runs almost entirely along the dismantled trackbed of the Hull and Hornsea Railway and is known as the Hornsea Rail Trail.

Hull to York 

Route 65 avoids the Yorkshire Wolds by running along the banks of the Humber Estuary, passing under the Humber Bridge. A very flat route, there is a small climb at Welton. Mainly on quiet country lanes as far as Selby, there are several short traffic-free sections. From Selby to York the route uses the trackbed of the old East Coast Mainline railway, which was bought by Sustrans for £1 and turned into one of its first traffic-free paths. On a  section of this path is a scale model of the Solar System.

NCN Route 66 provides an alternative route between Hull and York.

York to Middlesbrough 
Following a traffic-free route out of York, the rest of the route is almost entirely on quiet country lanes. North of York, NCN 65 passes Beningbrough Hall. There are two routes here, the path through the National Trust grounds is one-way, so the northbound path is routed around the perimeter. At Easingwold, Route 65 leaves the flat for the first time as it approaches the North York Moors. Running along the foothills there are several short steep climbs/descents. The route climbs over the North Western edge of the North York Moors, passing to the east of Osmotherley. Its high point is reached via a long steep climb up a forestry commission path. The route in Middlesbrough is mainly traffic free.

Route 65 forms part of the Way of the Roses Challenge route between York (junction with NCN 658) and Linton-on-Ouse (junction with NCN 688).

Developments 
The route through York was improved in April 2019 with the Scarborough Bridge improvements. The steep steps and narrow deck have been replaced by ramps and a 3.7m wide path.

History 

The original route north of York consisted of three branches all numbered as Route 65. In 2009 Sustrans introduced 3 digit numbers for shorter local routes and two of the three branches of Route 65 were renumbered. The Thirsk branch became Route 657 and the High Level Option is now Route 656. The Low Level Option remains as Route 65.

Millennium Mileposts 

There are over 1,000 Mileposts on the National Cycle Network. A number of the mileposts are located on Route 65.

Related NCN routes 

Route 65 meets the following routes:

Route 1 at Hessle  and Middlesbrough 
Route 62 at Selby 
Route 66 at Hull  and York 
Route 71 at Kirky Knowle 
Route 165 at Hutton Rudby 
Route 656 at Coxwold  and Osmotherley 
Route 657 at Easingwold  and Kirkby Knowle 
Route 658 at York 
Route 665 at York 
Route 688 at Linton-on-Ouse 

Route 65 is part of the Way of the Roses along with:

Route 65 is part of the Trans Pennine Trail (East) along with Route 62

References

External links

 Route 65 on the Sustrans website.
 Route 65 on OpenStreetMap

Cycleways in England